Myrtle was a steamboat built in 1909 for service on the Coquille River and its tributaries, in Oregon.  The ability of this small vessel to reach remote locations on the river system was cited many years later as evidence in support of the important legal concept of navigability.

This steamboat should not be confused with a somewhat larger vessel, also named Myrtle, which was built in 1908 at Prosper, Oregon, but which was home-ported much further north, at Astoria.

Construction
Myrtle was built at Myrtle Point, Oregon, in 1909 for service on the Coquille River with the Myrtle Point Transportation Company.

In 1915 the case came to trial before the Coos County Circuit Court, with Judge John S. Coke presiding.  Trial took over three days and 41 witnesses testified.  One witness who had seen the boom torn away stated that "the brush came down the river with such force and so high that it brushed the county bridge, 35 feet above the water and shook it."  The transportation company claimed losses of $2,500, representing $1,000 in damage to the boats, $800 in repairs, and $700 in lost revenues from the boats when they were taken from their run.

The Port of Coquille alleged that the milling company's boom was too far out in the stream and that the boat company had been negligent in mooring their boats to the boom.   The port also claimed the boat company was negligent by not posting a night watchman on the boats, and that had steam been kept up, the boats could have avoided being stranded on the jetty.  The port also claimed that the lumber company's boom was defective.

The jury however on June 11, 1915, returned a verdict in favor of the boat company, and awarded damages against the Port of Coquille in the amount of $1,750.  The port appealed, but the Supreme Court of Oregon ruled against them, finding that the evidence, evaluated in the light most favorable to the prevailing party, that is, the boat company, was sufficient to sustain the verdict.

Fines for defective equipment
In September 1915, as part of a widespread effort by the steamboat inspection service to crack down on safety violations in the Coos Bay area, the owners of the steamer Myrtle (W.R. Panter, T.W. Panter, W.A. Panter, S. Hufford, and Elmer Hufford) were fined $10 for not having an endorsement for change of master for the vessel, $100 for no fog horn, and $100 for having a defective fire extinguisher on board.  The occasion for the fines was the then recent (July 24, 1915) disaster in Chicago to the steamship Eastland, The possible remission of fines following compliance was not ruled out by the inspectors.

Competition
Myrtle was opposed by the motor launch Charm,  and had difficulty competing with the rival vessel.

Sinking at the dock
In February 1921, Myrtle sank at a dock at Myrtle Point.   On board was a cargo consisting of most of a rail car load of canned carrots.  The sternwheeler Dora, then also owned by the Panter family doing business as the Myrtle Point Transportation Company, was sent to Myrtle Point to aid in the salvage of Myrtle and the cargo.

Reconstruction

The conversion was done at the Herman Bros. yard at Prosper. For a time thereafter James W. Exon, of Portland, Oregon operated the vessel on the river.

Disposition
Myrtle was abandoned along the bank of the Coquille River on the ranch of Paris Ward, one of the shareholders in the Myrtle Point Transportation Company.

See also 
Steamboats of the Coquille River

Notes

References
 Historic Oregon Newspapers

1909 ships
Coos Bay Mosquito Fleet
Steamboats of Oregon
Ships built in Oregon